Carol Connors is an American former pornographic actress. She starred in about 20 adult movies between 1971 and 1981. Married to fellow former porn star Jack Birch, she is the mother of actress Thora Birch.

Early life
Connors was born in New Jersey and grew up in New Jersey and Texas.

Career
Connors began her adult entertainment career in the early 1970s, achieving fame in Deep Throat in 1972 and The Erotic Adventures of Candy in 1978. In 1979, she starred in Gail Palmer's Candy Goes to Hollywood. In 1981, she directed and starred in Desire for Men.

Connors also appeared on The Gong Show, where she eventually became one of Chuck Barris's introducers. Her debut on the program, in 1977, was as a song-and-dance contestant. Said Connors, "I was awarded nine points by the two men judges and two points by Jaye P. Morgan, one for each ... bosom." She was subsequently invited back for frequent appearances as one of the hostesses who introduced Barris at the start of the show. Her Gong Show appearances were parodied in Candy Goes To Hollywood.

Connors also appeared alongside Aldo Ray in Sweet Savage, a porn western film, in 1979. The movie was shot on location at Apacheland Movie Ranch in Apache Junction, Arizona.

References

External links
 
 
 

1955 births
Living people
American female adult models
American pornographic film actresses
Pornographic film actors from New Jersey
21st-century American women